Noubahini College, Dhaka or BNCD is a primary, lower-secondary, secondary and higher secondary school in Dhaka which is run by Bangladesh Navy. Noubahini College Dhaka is also known as Bangladesh Navy College Dhaka or B. N. College Dhaka.

History 
Noubahini College, Dhaka started its journey as Fahmida Cantonment School on 21 February 1978. It was converted into Bangladesh Navy School Dhaka in 1982. Bangladesh Navy College Dhaka came into being in July 1996 as a separate institution. As per directives of Naval Headquarters, Bangladesh Navy College and School were combined with being regarded as a single educational institution in October 1998 and named as Bangladesh Navy College Dhaka. In April 2022, the name of the institution changed once again to Noubahini College, Dhaka.

Clubs 
Noubahini College, Dhaka has several extracurricular clubs.
 Navians Debating Society - NDS
 BNCD Photographic Society
 BNCD Information Technology Club
 BNCD Science Club
 BNCD Social Welfare Club
 BNCD Business Club
 BNCD Literature Club

References 

Schools in Dhaka District
1978 establishments in Bangladesh
Educational institutions established in 1978
Colleges in Bangladesh